Tonga is a Pacific Island nation whose people are known as Tongans.

Tonga may also refer to:

Ethnic groups
Tonga people (Zambia and Zimbabwe)
Tonga people (Malawi)

Languages
Tongan language, or Tonga,  a Polynesian language spoken in Tonga in the South Pacific
Tonga language (Zambia and Zimbabwe), or Chitonga, a Bantu language spoken in Zambia and Zimbabwe
Tonga language (Mozambique), or Gitonga, a Bantu language spoken in Mozambique
Tonga language (Malawi), or Chitonga, a Bantu language spoken in Malawi
Ten'edn, also known as Tonga or Mos, a Mon-Khmer language spoken  in Thailand and Malaysia

Places
Kingdom of Tonga (1900–1970), protected state of the United Kingdom
Tonga, Cameroon, a town and commune in Ouest region
Tonga River, Fiji
Tonga Island, New Zealand
Tonga, Mpumalanga, South Africa, a town
Tonga, southern Sudan, a village that housed a Catholic mission station; see  Shilluk people
Tonga (Tuvalu), a village on the island of Nanumanga, Tuvalu
Tonga Plate, a small tectonic plate in the southwest Pacific Ocean
Tonga Trench, an oceanic trench in the south Pacific Ocean

Polynesian mythology
the southwest wind, the last wind to be reined in by Māui
the name of the first woman in Tonga

Other uses
Tonga (name), a list of those with Tonga as either a given name or surname
A version of Intel's Pentium II microprocessor designed for laptops
Operation Tonga, an airborne operation during the World War II Battle of Normandy
Tonga Cup, Tonga's premier knockout football tournament
Tanga (carriage) or Tonga, a horse-drawn carriage in India, Pakistan, and Bangladesh
Tonga, codename of AMD Radeon GPUs; see R9 285/380/380X

See also
Tongo (disambiguation)